To the Secrets and Knowledge is the fourth studio album by the Christian rock band Number One Gun. It was originally released under Tooth & Nail Records on January 26, 2010.

Track listing
 "The Victory" - 3:08
 "Big Machines" - 3:29
 "Forest" - 4:05
 "Noises" - 2:44
 "Hey Stranger" - 3:01
 "The People" - 2:35
 "White Lies" - 3:20
 "Look to Pass" (Instrumental) - 3:06
 "Try It" - 3:13

Album changes
The original version of the album included a tenth track which was a cover of "Don't Stop Believin'" by Journey. In February 2010, the album was removed from iTunes and stores due to "content issues". Although the band announced that it would substitute the cover song for a new final track, the album was re-released on April 20, 2010 with only nine tracks.

References

Number One Gun albums
2010 albums
Tooth & Nail Records albums